Alto do Ipiranga is a station on Line 2 (Green) of the São Paulo Metro.

Station layout

References

São Paulo Metro stations
Railway stations located underground in Brazil